The Insurgency in Sindh is a low-intensity insurgency waged by Sindhi Nationalists against the government of Pakistan. Sindhi nationalists want to create an independent state called Sindhudesh. However, this movement never gained support from the populace of Urban Sindh. Supporters of this have been increasing over the recent years as Sindhis grieve over the projects such as CPEC and cases of forced conversions that harm their province Sindh, the demand has mostly arisen from Rural Sindh.

Sindhi nationalists have allied up with Baloch nationalists over the years to counter Pakistan's security forces.

The Muhajirs fearing relocation and non-Sindhi communities which reside mainly in Urban Sindh have collaborated with Pakistan state forces over the years countering the insurgency.

Background 

The book Chach Nama chronicles the Chacha Dynasty's period, following the demise of the Rai Dynasty and the ascent of Chach of Alor to the throne, down to the Arab conquest by Muhammad bin Qasim in the early 8th century CE, by defeating the last Hindu monarch of Sindh, Raja Dahir.

Conquered by Syrian Arabs led by Muhammad bin Qasim, Sindh became the easternmost province of the Umayyad Caliphate. The Arab province of Sindh is modern Pakistan. While the lands of modern India further east were known to the Arabs as Hind. The defeat of the Brahmin ruler Dahir was made easier due to the tension between the Buddhist majority and the ruling Brahmins' fragile base of control. The Arabs redefined the region and adopted the term budd to refer to the numerous Buddhist idols they encountered, a word that remains in use today. The city of Mansura was established as a regional capital and Arab rule lasted for nearly 3 centuries and a fusion of cultures produced much of what is today modern Sindhi society. Arab geographers, historians and travellers also sometimes called the entire area from the Arabian Sea to the Hindu Kush, Sindh. The meaning of the word Sindhu being water (or ocean) appears to refer to the Indus river. In addition, there is a mythological belief among Muslims that four rivers had sprung from Heaven: Neel (Nile), Furat (Euphrates), Jehoon (Jaxartes) and Sehoon (Sind or in modern times the Indus).

Arab rule ended with the ascension of the indigenous Parmar Rajput Soomro dynasty. Later, in the mid-13th century the Soomros were replaced by the Muslim Rajput Samma dynasty.

Turkic invaders sent expeditions to the area from the 9th century, and part of the region loosely became part of the Ghaznavid Empire and then the Delhi Sultanate which lasted until 1524. The Mughals seized the region and their rule lasted for another two centuries, while the local Sindhi Muslim Rajput tribe, the Samma, challenged Mughal rule from their base at Thatta. The Muslim Sufi played a pivotal role in converting the millions of native people to Islam. Sindh, though part of larger empires, continued to enjoy certain autonomy as a loyal Muslim domain and came under the rule of the Arghun Dynasty and Turkhan or Tarkhan dynasty from 1519 to 1625. Sind became a vassal-state of the Afghan Durrani Empire by 1747. It was then ruled by Kalhora rulers and later the Baluchi Talpurs  from 1783.

The British conquered Sindh in 1843. General Charles Napier is said to have reported victory to the Governor General with a one-word telegram, namely "Peccavi" – or "I have sinned" (Latin). In fact, this pun first appeared as a cartoon in Punch magazine.

The first Aga Khan helped the British in the conquest of Sindh and was granted a pension as a result. Sind was made part of British India's Bombay Presidency, and became a separate province in 1936.  The British ruled the area for a century and Sindh was home to many prominent Muslim leaders including Muhammad Ali Jinnah who agitated for greater Muslim autonomy.

Following World War II, Britain withdrew from British India and Sindh voted to join Pakistan in 1947 during partition as the largely Hindu educated elites were replaced by Muslim immigrants from India. Later local Sindhis have resented the influx of Pashtun and Punjabi immigrants to Karachi. Nonetheless, traditional Sindhi families remain prominent in Pakistani politics, especially the Bhutto dynasty.

All India Muslim League branch in Sindh was established by Ghulam Muhammad Bhurgari in 1918. All India Muslim League and Congress party of Sindh held their annual sessions at the same place simultaneously and passed a similar resolution. Abdullah Haroon, who joined it in 1918 was elected the president of the province at Muslim League in 1920.

In 1972, G. M. Syed proposed the formation of an independent nation for the Sindhis under the name Sindhudesh. He was the first nationalist politician in Pakistan to call for the independence of Sindh in a Pakistan divided by the liberation of Bangladesh. The movement for Sindhi language and identity led by Syed drew inspiration from the Bengali language movement. In post independence Pakistan, the machinations of the Pakistani state convinced Syed that Sindhis would be marginalised in the set up. The concept of Sindhudesh as propounded by Syed calls for the liberation and freedom of Sindhis from an alleged Punjabi-Mohajir imperialism.

With his political base largely weakened after election, Syed later advanced his position towards openly demanding separation from Pakistan and the build-up of an independent Sindhudesh in his books.

The concept of Sindhudesh is also supported by some Sindhi diaspora including Sindhis in India, most of whom had to be relocated out of Sindh after Partition, leaving behind their property as evacuee trusts under reciprocal government supervision. Pre-partition, Sindh was a relative peaceful province, with communal violence only erupting sporadically and during partition.  This peace stopped after partition, with post-partition migrants to Sindh angry at the "non-co-operation" in the killing of Hindus; and communal hatred multiplied post partition.

After the death of the former Prime Minister of Pakistan, Benazir Bhutto, the Sindhudesh movement was believed to have seen an increase in popularity. Sindhi nationalists judge that Sindh has been used to the advantage of people from non-Sindhi ethnic groups, citing the dominance of Muhajir people in key areas of Sindh including Karachi, large scale migration to Sindh from other regions of Pakistan, including Khyber Pakhtunkhwa, alleged Punjabi dominance in the defence sector, and an increase in Taliban migrants moving to Sindh; as well as terrorist related attacks on the region. and believe this to be the cause of recent troubles in Sindh (see Sindhi nationalism).

However, neither the separatist party nor the nationalist party have ever been able to take centre stage in Sindh. Local Sindhis strongly support Pakistan People Party (PPP). The unparalleled and unhindered success of the PPP in Sindh shows the preference of Sindhis for a constitutional political process over a separatist agenda to resolve their grievances. Similarly public opinion is also not heavily in favour of these parties either. In other words, neither the Sindhi separatists nor the nationalists have significant popular support — certainly not the kind that will make them capable of fuelling a full-scale insurgency.

Timeline 
17 August 2003 – In two separate acts of sabotage, portions of railway tracks were destroyed when bombs exploded on up and down tracks in Kotri and Nawabshah.16 August 2004 – Two bombs explode near Nawabshah, 250 km (150 miles) north-east of Karachi. The first explosion damaged a rail track, while the second explosion a few minutes later wounded two policemen and a journalist who were at the scene.13 June 2005 – Two electricity pylons of 500kv high transmission line were damaged near the Sann railway station.14 July 2010 – Sindhi separatists try to blow up Hyderabad railway track, Bomb Disposal Squad defused four bombs found by residents on the track of the Odero Lal Railway Station in Hyderabad.15 July 2010 – 3 feet of railway tracks destroyed in blast.1 November 2010 – Two bomb blast at Railway Track between Kotri & Hyderabad.2 November 2010 – 4 bombs go off, destroying railway tracks in Hyderabad.4 November 2010 – A low-intensity bomb exploded at railway tracks near Nawabshah, just minutes after a cargo train carrying oil had passed. Another bomb was defused by the bomb disposal squad.6 November 2010 – Two (JSMM) activists were arrested after being suspected masterminds of the bomb incidents in begin November.11 February 2011 – Ten low-intensity explosions at railway tracks across Sindh.12 February 2011 – Blast at rail track near Kotri station 15 February 2011 – Twin blasts damage railway tracks near Matiari.17 February 2011 – Twin blasts damage railway tracks in Karachi.29 April 2011 – Blast forces train off the tracks in Sukkur.27 November 2011 – Six bomb blasts damage railway tracks in Sindh.26 May 2012 – On the National Highway a group of unknown gunmen attacked and killed 7 people and at least 25 more were injured in a passenger bus. SLA claimed the attack.12 July 2013 – Two powerful blasts rocked Hyderabad, one at the boundary wall of the office of Senior Superintendent of Police (SSP) Hyderabad and the other at a railway track in Hussainabad. Both the explosions were heard far and wide.5 November 2013 – A bomb planted near a railway track near Hussainabad in Hyderabad destroyed a portion of up-track. A second bomb went off in Khairpur District after the departure of the Shalimar Express to Karachi via the Gambat railway station.14 November 2016  – A vehicle of Chinese engineer targeted with remote control bomb at Gulshan-e-Hadeed Karachi. Chinese national and his driver were seriously injured.5 August 2020 – The Sindhudesh Revolutionary Army claimed responsibility for a grenade attack on a rally organized by the Jamaat-i-Islami in Karachi that injured about 40 people. The rally was taken out on the first anniversary of  India government’s decision to revoke the special status of Jammu and Kashmir.14 March 2022 – The Counter Terrorism Department arrests three members of the SRA in Sukkur.1 April 2022 – Two blasts damage railway tracks in Kotri, the SRA claims responsibility.7 April 2022 – Three alleged militants of the SRA were arrested by Hussainabad police.29 April 2022 – A blast damages an electricity pylon near Tando Mohammad Khan road, SRA claims responsibility.12 May 2022 – The Sindhudesh Revolutionary Army claimed responsibility for an attack in the Saddar area of Karachi killing one person and injuring seven others.17 May 2022 – Larkana police claimed to have arrested six militants of the Asghar Shah group of the SRA in Nasirabad.

See also
 Insurgency in Balochistan
 Insurgency in Khyber Pakhtunkhwa

References

20th-century conflicts
20th century in Pakistan
21st-century conflicts
21st century in Pakistan
History of Sindh
Politics of Sindh
Provincial disputes in Pakistan
Separatism in Pakistan
Sindhi nationalism